WLBS (91.7 FM, "Radio in the Delaware Valley") is a radio station broadcasting a big band/doo wop/oldies music format, simulcasting WRDV 89.3 FM Warminster. Licensed to Bristol, Pennsylvania, the station is currently owned by Bux-Mont Educational Radio Association.

References

External links

LBS
Bucks County, Pennsylvania
Radio stations established in 1983